Cambridgeshire is a former Parliamentary constituency in the United Kingdom. It was a constituency of the House of Commons of the Parliament of England then of the Parliament of Great Britain from 1707 to 1800 and of the Parliament of the United Kingdom from 1801 to 1885.

History
The county was represented by two Knights of the Shire until 1832, when the number of members was increased to three by the Great Reform Act. Under the Redistribution of Seats Act 1885, the constituency was abolished and was divided into three single-member constituencies: the Western or Chesterton Division, the Eastern or Newmarket Division and the Northern or Wisbech Division.

Under the Local Government Act 1888, the historic county of Cambridgeshire was divided between the administrative counties of Cambridgeshire and Isle of Ely.  When the parliamentary constituencies were next redistributed under the Representation of the People Act 1918, Cambridgeshire was re-constituted as a single-member Parliamentary County, largely formed from combining the Chesterton Division (excluding areas that were now part of the expanded Municipal Borough of Cambridge) and the Newmarket Division (excluding the city of Ely which was included in the Parliamentary County of Isle of Ely).

The administrative counties of Cambridgeshire and Isle of Ely had been recombined in 1965 and Cambridgeshire was further expanded in 1974 to include Huntingdon and Peterborough under the Local Government Act 1972.  Under the subsequent redistribution of seats, which did not come into effect until the 1983 general election, Cambridgeshire was abolished as a county constituency, forming the bulk of the new constituency of South East Cambridgeshire and the majority of South West Cambridgeshire.

Boundaries

1290–1653, 1658-1885: The historic county of Cambridgeshire. (Although Cambridgeshire contained the borough of Cambridge, which elected two MPs in its own right, this was not excluded from the county constituency, and owning property within the borough could confer a vote at the county election. In the elections of 1830 and 1831, about an eighth of the votes cast for the county came from within Cambridge itself. The city of Ely also elected its own MPs in 1295.)

1654–1658 The historic county was divided for the First and the Second Protectorate Parliaments, between the two-member Isle of Ely area and the four-member constituency consisting of the rest of the county.

1918–1983: The administrative county of Cambridgeshire, excluding the Municipal Borough of Cambridge. There were minor boundary changes in 1950, when some of the constituency was transferred to the Cambridge seat, which was expanded to align with the Municipal Borough, and in 1974, to align with changes to the county boundary.

Members of Parliament

 Constituency created (1290)

MPs 1290-1660

MPs 1660-1832

MPs 1832–1885

MPs 1918-1983

Elections

Elections in the 1970s

Elections in the 1960s

Elections in the 1950s

Elections in the 1940s

Elections in the 1930s

Elections in the 1920s

Elections in the 1910s

Elections in the 1880s

 Caused by Brand's elevation to the peerage, becoming Viscount Hampden.

 Caused by Rodwell's resignation.

Elections in the 1870s

 Caused by Yorke's death.

 Caused by Manners' death.

 Caused by Yorke's succession to the peerage, becoming Earl of Hardwicke.

Elections in the 1860s

 

 Caused by Yorke's appointment as Comptroller of the Household.

 Caused by Ball's resignation.

Elections in the 1850s

Elections in the 1840s

Elections in the 1830s

Caused by Osborne's resignation

See also
Parliamentary representation from Cambridgeshire
List of former United Kingdom Parliament constituencies
Unreformed House of Commons

References

 Boundaries of Parliamentary Constituencies 1885-1972, compiled and edited by F.W.S. Craig (Parliamentary Reference Publications 1972)
 British Parliamentary Constituencies: A Statistical Compendium, by Ivor Crewe and Anthony Fox (Faber and Faber 1984)
 John Cannon, Parliamentary Representation 1832 - England and Wales (Cambridge: Cambridge University Press, 1973)

Parliamentary constituencies in Cambridgeshire (historic)
Constituencies of the Parliament of the United Kingdom established in 1290
Constituencies of the Parliament of the United Kingdom disestablished in 1885
Constituencies of the Parliament of the United Kingdom established in 1918
Constituencies of the Parliament of the United Kingdom disestablished in 1983